World Series of Country Music Proudly Presents Stock Car Racing's Entertainers of the Year is a studio album released in 1985 by World Series of Country Music. The album was compiled of 21 original country music songs with lead vocals of all songs all sung by various NASCAR drivers, plus an introduction track by Ned Jarrett.

Background 
The album was the creation of country music promoter Mike Hopkins, who wanted to create a concept album featuring NASCAR's biggest stars to express themselves musically. Hopkins, trying to avoid the flop of NASCAR Goes Country, hired 25 professional songwriters to write songs for the album, of which 80 songs were created, and 21 were chosen for drivers to sing. Songs were chosen based on a driver interview, asking them what drove their ambition, heroes, families, and more. Hopkins told the songwriters "Here are the words of an auto racer, what he believes, what he stands for. You go and write me a song from this material." Around $200,000 was poured into the project.

Many of the songs relate to achievements or the drivers' personality. For example, Bobby Hillin Jr. talks about his crew chief, Harry Hyde. Dale Earnhardt's song, "Hard Charger", relates to his rough reputation. Bill Elliott's song talks about his career.

Fans formerly could order an album by sending $19.95 plus $3.00 handling to World Series of Country Music. To help promote the album, NASCAR driver and legend Ned Jarrett would make commercials promoting the album in 1985.

Track listing

Reception 
While better than the previous album including NASCAR drivers, it was still a flop. Only 20,000 copies were ever sold, and the album was eventually pulled a couple of years later by the label. The album has gone largely into obscurity, but on occasion NASCAR and its drivers still remember the album.

References 

Country albums by American artists
NASCAR mass media